Puok District is one of twelve districts in Siem Reap Province, in north-western Cambodia. According to the 1998 census of Cambodia, it had a population of 110,863.

Administration

References 

Districts of Cambodia
Geography of Siem Reap province